Eliška is a name for Czech girls, which is rendered Elise in English, German and French. 

It may refer to:

Eliška Bučková (born 1989), pageant titleholder who won the title of Czech Miss 2008
Eliška Junková (1900–1994), one of the greatest female drivers in Grand Prix motor racing history
Eliška Kleinová (1912–1999), Czech Jewish pianist, music educator, and sister of Gideon Klein
Eliška Krásnohorská (1847–1926), Czech feminist author

See also
 Eliska Cross (born 1986), French actress
Radomil Eliška (born 1931), Czech conductor

Czech feminine given names